Fossil-bearing stratigraphic units found in Slovenia span time periods from the Carboniferous to the Neogene.

Stratigraphic formations

See also 
 Lists of fossiliferous stratigraphic units in Europe

References 
 

 Slovenia
Geologic formations of Slovenia
Slovenia geology-related lists
Paleontology in Slovenia